Point de Venise is a Venetian needle lace from the 17th century characterized by scrolling floral patterns with additional floral motifs worked in relief (in contrast with the geometric designs of the earlier reticella). By the mid-seventeenth century, it had overtaken Flemish lace as the most desirable type of lace in contemporary European fashion.

Beginning in 1620 it became separated into Venetian raised lace (which became known by the French term "gros point de Venise") and Venetian flat lace (in French "point plat de Venise").  The former (now known in English as "Venetian Gros Point") is characterized by having a raised pattern created through the use of cordonette worked over with buttonholing so that the curves achieved an elevated quality similar to a relief carving.

Notes

References
Lefébure, Ernest, b. 1835: Embroidery and Lace: Their Manufacture and History from the Remotest Antiquity to the Present Day (London: H. Grevel and Co., 1888), ed. by Alan S. Cole Online Books page
Montupet, Janine, and Ghislaine Schoeller: Lace: The Elegant Web, 

Needle lace
Textile arts of Italy